Robert Scott Williams is a retired lieutenant general in the United States Air Force. He final assignment was the commander of the First Air Force at Tyndall Air Force Base. He has over 3,900 flight hours, including 300 combat hours.

Air Force career
After graduating with a bachelor's degree in aerospace engineering from Georgia Institute of Technology, Williams commissioned as a second lieutenant in the United States Air Force in November 1984. He attended pilot training at Columbus Air Force Base, and subsequently served as a T-38 Talon instructor pilot. In 1990, he transitioned to flying the F-16 Fighting Falcon, and later served as a fighter pilot at Macdill Air Force Base, Spangdahlem Air Base, Osan Air Base, and McEntire Joint National Guard Base. Additionally, he was the branch and division chief in several departments at the Air National Guard Readiness Center (ANGRC) and The Pentagon.  He attended the National Defense University and commanded the 169th Operations Group, the 169th Fighter Wing, and the ANGRC. He was the chief of the Office of Military Cooperation in the United States Embassy in Kuwait. In July 2016, he assumed command of the First Air Force and the Continental NORAD Region. In July 2019, he retired from the United States Air Force.

Awards and decorations

Effective dates of promotion

References

Georgia Tech alumni
Living people
Recipients of the Air Force Distinguished Service Medal
Recipients of the Defense Superior Service Medal
Recipients of the Legion of Merit
United States Air Force generals
United States Air Force personnel of the Iraq War
Year of birth missing (living people)